The 1988–89 Indiana Hoosiers men's basketball team represented Indiana University. Their head coach was Bobby Knight, who was in his 18th year. The team played its home games in Assembly Hall in Bloomington, Indiana, and was a member of the Big Ten Conference.

The Hoosiers finished the regular season with an overall record of 27–8 and a conference record of 15–3, finishing 1st in the Big Ten Conference. As the Big Ten Conference Champions, the Hoosiers were invited to participate in the 1989 NCAA tournament as a 2-seed. IU made it to the Sweet Sixteen where they lost to 3-seed and eventual national runner-up Seton Hall.

Roster

Schedule/Results

|-
!colspan=8| Regular Season
|-

|-
!colspan=8| NCAA tournament

Rankings

References

Indiana Hoosiers men's basketball seasons
Indiana
1988 in sports in Indiana
1989 in sports in Indiana
Indiana